"Do You Miss Me?" was written and produced by Glenn Gutierrez for Jocelyn Enriquez. The single was debuted on the San Francisco radio station Wild 107.7 (now Wild 94.9) and then released in 1996 on Classified Records. As momentum picked up for the single it led to a joint venture between Tommy Boy Records, imprint Timber! Records and Classified Records. Gutierrez wrote this song about the end of his relationship by the same woman who inspired "I Didn't Know Love Would Break My Heart" on Enriquez's debut album "Lovely". The song was re-released in 1997 as the lead single from her second album, Jocelyn and includes the 'Running Mix' inspired by Information Society's "Running". The song became an international hit and lead to her to tour countries such as Brazil, Philippines, and perform on the hit talk show Ricki Lake. "Do You Miss Me?" peaked at #49 on the Billboard Hot 100, #17 on the Rhythmic Top 40, #14 on the Top 40 Mainstream chart, #8 on the Hot Dance Singles Sales chart, and #12 on the Canadian Singles Chart. In 2001, a fast-paced rock cover version of the song was released by Lucky Boys Confusion.

Track listing

 CD Maxi Single [Classified Records]

 The Remixes CD Maxi Single [Classified Records/Timber! Records/Tommy Boy Records]

Charts

1996 songs
1996 singles
1997 singles
Jocelyn Enriquez songs
House music songs